Apetina Airstrip  is an airstrip near the village Apetina in Suriname.

Airlines and destinations 
Airlines serving this airport are:

Accidents and incidents
 On 25 September 1986 a Cessna U206G Stationair 6, registration PZ-TAC from Gonini Air Service was hijacked at Apetina kondre airstrip by rebels of the "Jungle Commando" of Ronnie Brunswijk. The pilot (O. van Amson jr.) was forced to fly the aircraft to an unknown location. In May 1988 the airplane was at the Botopasi Airstrip in Suriname with a flat tire; apparently at that time in use by the jungle commando. The aircraft never returned to the owner and was canceled from the Surinamese Aviation register in 1993.

See also

 List of airports in Suriname
 Transport in Suriname

References

Airports in Suriname
Sipaliwini District